Amina Adamu Augie (born 3 September 1953 in Kebbi State, Nigeria) is a Nigerian jurist and Justice of the Supreme Court of Nigeria.

Early Life and Educational Background 
Augie was born on September 3, 1953, in Lagos, Nigeria. She has eight siblings and hails from Kebbi State in North West Nigeria. Between 1958 and 1971, she had her primary and secondary education in different schools including: Abadina School, Ibadan, Hope Waddell Primary School, Calabar, Holy Rosary Primary School, Enugu and in Kaduna at Queen Amina College from 1969-1971, all in Nigeria 

After her early education, Augie enrolled at the University of Ife, Ile-Ife, from 1972 to 1977 where she bagged LLB. She then attended the Nigerian Law School became a barrister and solicitor of the Federal Republic of Nigeria in 1978. She later enrolled at the University of Lagos to obtain her LLM between 1986 and 1987 in criminology

References 

1953 births
Living people
Nigerian jurists
People from Kebbi State
Supreme Court of Nigeria justices